Nabbøya is a high, small, bare rock island lying  west of Hamnenabben Head in the east part of Lutzow-Holm Bay. Mapped by Norwegian cartographers from air photos taken by the Lars Christensen Expedition, 1936–37, and named Nabbøya (the peg island).

See also 

Islands of Queen Maud Land
Prince Harald Coast